Arctoscelia is a genus of moths in the family Geometridae.

Species
 Arctoscelia onusta Warren, 1897

References
 Arctoscelia at Markku Savela's Lepidoptera and Some Other Life Forms

Ennominae
Geometridae genera